Alexis Delahante (1767–1837) was a French painter and antiques and art dealer, most notable for his advice to European aristocrats in London and elsewhere before and after the French Revolution.

Sources
 Sylvain Cordier, 'Inventing and selling historical furniture: The taste and the career of Alexis Delahante, painter, expert and curio dealer', Revue de l'Art 184(2):63-74 - June 2014 

French art dealers
1767 births
1837 deaths
18th-century French painters
19th-century French painters